

The Austin Ant (development code ADO19) is a small four-wheel drive vehicle that was designed by Sir Alec Issigonis for the motor manufacturer Austin. Although the Ant is widely regarded as a military vehicle, some sources suggest it was conceived with civilian use in mind as well. In its military role, it was a potential successor to the military version of an earlier Issigonis design, the Mini Moke.

The Ant was cancelled in 1968 before full-scale production began, during the period when BMC became part of the British Leyland (BL) conglomerate; the merger caused several overlaps in model ranges, and the Ant was regarded as too close a competitor for the Land Rover range.

The Ant used an A-Series engine, transverse mounted and tilted slightly backward to allow greater ground clearance and suspension movement. The main gearbox was placed in the engine sump, as on the Mini. A reduction gearbox took power from the main gearbox to the rear axle via a propshaft. The same layout was used 30 years later (with a K-Series engine) on the Rover Group's Land Rover Freelander.

See also
 Nuffield Guppy

References

External links
 Moke and Ant at Austin Memories
 Image of Austin Ant

Military vehicles of the United Kingdom
Issigonis vehicles
All-wheel-drive vehicles
Ant